"Ain't No Love in the Heart of the City" is a 1974 R&B song written by Michael Price and Dan Walsh, and first recorded by Bobby "Blue" Bland for the ABC Dunhill album Dreamer.

Background
While it is ostensibly a love song, some critics and fans have also heard it as a lament on urban poverty and hopelessness, as well as a lament upon the struggle to achieve one's goals in life in the absence of external support.  "Ain't No Love in the Heart of the City" remains a cult favorite, and is considered a classic.

Chart performance
In the US, Bland scored a top ten hit on the Hot Soul Singles chart, where it peaked at #9, as well as peaking at #91 on the Hot 100.

Cover versions and samples
It is known through several cover versions and samples:
A well-known cover of the song is by the hard rock band Whitesnake, who included it on their 1978 debut EP, Snakebite, and again as a live recording on Live...in the Heart of the City. The cover was the new band's first hit, and it became a staple of their live set.
For his 2001 album The Blueprint, rapper Jay-Z recorded the song "Heart of the City (Ain't No Love)," a Kanye West-produced track built around a sample of Bobby Bland's chartmaking rendition. 

Other notable cover versions have been recorded by:
 Bobby Bazini - on his sophomore album “Where I Belong”(folk/soul, 2014)
The cover version by reggae singer Al Brown even changes most of the lyrics to magnify the emphasis of the lyrics. 
Barrett Strong (R&B, 1976)
Café Jacques - on the album Round the Back''' (rock, 1977)
Grady Tate (jazz, 1977)
Long John Baldry (blues, 1977)
Kate Taylor (rock, 1979)
Crystal Gayle (country, 1980)
Herman Brood (rock, Bühnensucht, live recording, 1985)
Chris Farlowe (R&B, 1985)
Ruthless Blues (blues, 1989)
Walter "Wolfman" Washington (New Orleans R&B, on 1991 album Sada)
The Good Earth (pop/rock, 1994)
Mick Abrahams (rock, 1996)
Jørn Lande (hard rock, The Snakes live in Europe 1998)
Paul Weller (rock, 1998)
Willie Clayton (R&B, 1998, as "Heart of the City")
Jay Z (on the album The Blueprint, as "Heart of City (Ain't No Love)", 2001)
Mary Coughlan (jazz, 2002)
DJ Andrew Unknown & DJ Mekalek (hip hop/rap (intro), 2002)
Joey Tempest (rock/metal, 2003)
Maggie Bell (rock, 2004, live recording)
Vaya Con Dios (rock, 2004)
YTcracker (From the "STC Is the Greatest" album, track #16, "spamcity", 2004)
Joe Budden (Rap, 2007)
Paul Carrack (Blue-Eyed Soul, Pop/Rock, 2008)
Allman Brothers (Blues, 2009 live recording)
Nicky Moore (blues rock, 2009)
GRiZ (sampled on the song "Where's The Love" on the album Mad Liberation, 2012)
Lukas Graham (Blue-Eyed Soul, 2012 as "Daddy, Now That You're Gone (Ain't No Love)")
Jo Harman And Company (blues, on the album Live At The Royal Albert Hall Recorded 2013, released 2014)
Dana Fuchs (On album "Broken Down, acoustic sessions" 2015)
Shane Pacey Trio (On album, "Helios" 2016)
Supersonic Blues Machine (On the album "West of flushing south of frisco" 2016)
C.S. Armstrong (On album, "Ain't No Love" 2016)
Zeshan B (On album, "Vetted" 2017)
Black Pumas (On the album Black Pumas Deluxe Edition Exclusive 2LP+7", released 2020)
DJ Khaled (Sampled on the intro track "THANKFUL", on the album KHALED KHALED, released 2021)
Gov't Mule (on the album 'Heavy Load Blues', released 2021)
Horace Andy (on album "Midnight Scorchers", released 2022)

Popular culture
Jay-Z's version of the song was used in the trailer for the 2007 film American Gangster, in a 2011 Chrysler commercial, as the theme song for the CBS series NYC 22 and a Crown Royal commercial in 2013.
The song is featured in the 2009 video game DJ Hero, in "mashed-up" form.
The song is played over the opening credits of the 2019 Norwegian time-travel fantasy comedy-drama television series Beforeigners.
The song is featured on the soundtracks to the 2009 film Fighting, the 2011 crime drama The Lincoln Lawyer and is also featured in the 2017 movie The Hitman’s Bodyguard''.   
The song is featured in episode 5 of Sex Education.
The song is also featured in season five of the Netflix series, Last Chance U, which focuses on the lives of Laney College football players and staff within Oakland, CA.

Charts
Whitesnake

References 

1974 songs
1978 songs
Whitesnake songs
Hard rock ballads
Rhythm and blues ballads
United Artists Records singles
Geffen Records singles
EMI Records singles
Liberty Records singles